Nokha Assembly constituency is one of the 243 assembly constituencies of Bihar, an eastern Indian state. Nokha is also part of Karakat Lok Sabha constituency.

Members of Legislative Assembly

Election results

2020

See also

 Nahan
 Rohtas district
 Karakat (Lok Sabha constituency)

References

External links
 

Rohtas district
Assembly constituencies of Bihar